Broniszów Castle is a castle in Broniszów, Gmina Kożuchów, within Nowa Sól County, Lubusz Voivodeship, in western Poland.

Originally built in the twelfth century as a knight's castle, in the sixteenth/seventeenth century it was transformed into a court building. The Renaissance three-storey building built of brick and stone with neo-Gothic tower walls closed in the nineteenth century. Since 1986 the castle has held the Broniszów National Photographic Workshops.

See also 
 Castles in Poland

References

Castles in Lubusz Voivodeship